was a town located in Oku District, Okayama Prefecture, Japan.

As of 2003, the town had an estimated population of 12,431 and a density of 424.27 persons per km². The total area was 29.30 km².

On November 1, 2004, Osafune, along with the towns of Oku and Ushimado (all from Oku District), was merged to create the city of Setouchi.

Dissolved municipalities of Okayama Prefecture
Populated places disestablished in 2004
2004 disestablishments in Japan
Setouchi, Okayama